The Grindavík women's basketball team, commonly known as Grindavík or UMFG for short, is the women's basketball department of Ungmennafélag Grindavíkur multi-sport club, based in the town of Grindavík in Iceland.  It won the national championship in 1997 and the Icelandic Basketball Cup in 2008 and 2015.

Recent history
In April 2019, Grindavík defeated 1. deild kvenna champions Fjölnir, 3-0, in the promotion playoffs for a seat in the Úrvalsdeild. With the worst record in the league, the team was relegated from the Úrvalsdeild in March 2020 after the final games of the season and the playoffs were canceled due to the Coronavirus pandemic in Iceland. In 2021, Grindavík defeated 1. deild kvenna champions Njarðvík, 3-2, in the promotion playoffs finals. After losing the first two games, the team mounted a improbable comeback by winning the next three games.

Honors
Úrvalsdeild
 Winners (1): 1997

Icelandic Basketball Cup
 Winners (2): 2008, 2015

Icelandic Super Cup
 Winners (1): 1997

1. deild kvenna
 Winners (1): 2012

Icelandic Company Cup
 Winners (1): 2001

Source

Notable players

 Birna Valgarðsdóttir
 Bríet Sif Hinriksdóttir
 Embla Kristínardóttir
 Erla Reynisdóttir
 Erla Þorsteinsdóttir
 Hildur Sigurðardóttir 
 Ingibjörg Jakobsdóttir
 Íris Sverrisdóttir
 Jessica Gaspar
 Jovana Stefánsdóttir
 Ólöf Helga Pálsdóttir
 María Ben Erlingsdóttir
 Pálína Gunnlaugsdóttir
 Penny Peppas
 Petrúnella Skúladóttir
 Sigrún Sjöfn Ámundadóttir
 Svandís Anna Sigurðardóttir
 Tamara Bowie
 Tamara Stocks

Coaches

 Richard Ross 1986–1987
 Brad Casey 7-11 1987–1988
 Douglas Harvey 1988–1989 
 Guðmundur Bragason 1989–1990
 Ellert S. Magnússon 1990–1991 
 Dan Krebbs 1991–1992
 Pálmi Ingólfsson 1992
 Dan Krebbs 4-5 1992–1993 
 Pálmi Ingólfsson 1993
 Nökkvi Már Jónsson 1993–1994
 Nökkvi Már Jónsson 1994–1995 
 Friðrik Ingi Rúnarsson 1995–1996 
 Ellert S. Magnússon 1996–1997 
 Jón Guðmundsson 1997–1998
 Pétur Rúrik Guðmundsson 1998
 Ellert S. Magnússon 1998–1999 
 Alexander Ermolinskij 1999–2000
 Páll Axel Vilbergsson 2000
 Pétur Rúrik Guðmundsson2000–2001 
 Unndór Sigurðsson 2001–2002 
 Eyjólfur Guðlaugsson 2002–2003 
 Pétur K. Guðmundsson 2003–2004
 Örvar Þór Kristjánsson 2004
 Henning Henningsson 2004–2005
 Unndór Sigurðsson 2005–2007 
 Igor Beljanski 2007-08
 Pétur Rúrik Guðmundsson 2008–2009 
 Jóhann Þór Ólafsson 2009–2011
 Unknown 2011–2012
 Bragi Magnússon 2012
 Ellert Magnússon 2012
 Crystal Smith 2012–2013
 Jón Halldór Eðvaldsson 2013–2014
 Lewis Clinch 2014
 Sverrir Þór Sverrisson 2014–2015
 Daníel Guðni Guðmundsson 2015–2016
 Björn Steinar Brynjólfsson 2016
 Bjarni Magnússon 2016–2017
 Páll Axel Vilbergsson 2017
 Angela Rodriguez 2017-2018
 Ólöf Helga Pálsdóttir 2018
 Jóhann Árni Ólafsson 2018–2020
 Ólöf Helga Pálsdóttir 2020–2021
 Þorleifur Ólafsson 2021–present

Source

References

Grindavík (basketball)